George Thomas Clarke (13 November 1853 – 11 March 1925) was an Australian local government politician, accountant and estate agent. Clark served many years in local government, beginning in New Zealand when he was Town Clerk of South Dunedin and an alderman and mayor of St Kilda before coming to Sydney and was elected an Alderman of the City of Sydney, rising to become Lord Mayor for a single partial term from May to December 1912. Clarke also served a single term as Mayor of North Sydney (1922–1923), having served on both North Sydney Municipal Council and its predecessor the Borough of St Leonards.

Early life and career
George Thomas Clarke was born in Melbourne in the Colony of Victoria on 13 November 1853, the son of William Joseph Sayers Clarke and Mary Ann Welsford. His elder brother William Clarke became prominent in banking and rose to be Member of Parliament for Orange and Minister for Justice in the Government of the Colony of New South Wales. After receiving his education at Collins Street Grammar School, Clarke studied accountancy but owing to health issues decided to travel away from busy Melbourne, taking a sea voyage in 1875. Clarke went no further than Dunedin in the Colony of New Zealand and after accepting warehouse work there, soon established his own accountancy and real estate business.

Political career
In 1878 he was appointed Town Clerk of the Borough of South Dunedin, but later left office to become a Councillor. Clarke also served as a Councillor for the St Kilda Borough Council and was elected as mayor for two terms in 1878–1880. While in New Zealand, in 1876 Clarke joined the Independent Order of Odd Fellows, an interest in which he carried over when he returned to Australia, arriving in Sydney in the early 1880s.

After setting up his business in the St Leonards region in northern Sydney, Clarke re-entered municipal politics when he was elected as an Alderman for Belmore Ward of the Borough of St Leonards in February 1888. As a member of the St Leonards council in 1890, Clarke was involved in the official representations to the colonial government to merge St Leonards with the neighbouring boroughs of East St Leonards and Victoria to form a single North Sydney borough. These representations were subsequently accepted and the Borough of North Sydney was proclaimed on 29 July 1890. As the proclamation continued the terms of office of the three elected councils, Clarke continued as an aldermen for the new borough. Clarke was not among those elected to the new six-member council elected in February 1891, but succeeded in returning by way of a vacancy in August 1891.

He was elected an alderman of the City of Sydney in 1904, and was elected Lord Mayor in 1912.

Later life
Survived by two sons, Clarke died while still serving as a North Sydney alderman on 11 March 1925 at his Wollstonecraft residence on Milner Crescent, "Domus", and was buried with Congregational and Masonic rites at Waverley Cemetery.

References

1853 births
1925 deaths
Australian people of English descent
Australian accountants
Australian real estate agents
People from Melbourne
Independent Order of Odd Fellows
Mayors of Dunedin
Australian emigrants to New Zealand
Mayors and Lord Mayors of Sydney
Mayors of North Sydney
Burials at Waverley Cemetery